Esteban Areta Vélez (14 April 1932 – 9 July 2007) was a Spanish footballer who played as a defender.

Honours
Barcelona
Inter-Cities Fairs Cup: 1955–58

External links
 
 
 National team data at BDFutbol
 
 Valencia CF profile 
 Real Betis profile 
 Cádiz CF profile  

1932 births
2007 deaths
Spanish footballers
Footballers from Pamplona
Association football defenders
La Liga players
Segunda División players
CA Osasuna players
Real Oviedo players
FC Barcelona players
FC Barcelona Atlètic players
Valencia CF players
Real Betis players
Cádiz CF players
Spain international footballers
Spanish football managers
La Liga managers
Real Betis managers